State Route 294 (SR 294) is a  state highway in southeastern Humboldt County, Nevada, United States, that runs along the northernmost part of Grass Valley Road and connects Winnemucca with the Grass Valley area south of the town.

Route description

SR 294 begins on Grass Valley Road at the Pershing County line in the northern part of the Grass Valley. (From Grass Valley Road, Muddy Road heads due east as a dirt road along the county line to end just short of the foothills the Sonoma Range and Power Line heads due west along the county line, also as a dirt road, to end at Herschell Road at the northeastern base of the East Range. Grass Valley Road continues south past the community of Grass Valley, through the Grass Valley, and on to the southern part of Pleasant Valley.) From its southern terminus, SR 294 heads north through the northern part of the Grass Valley, passing through agricultural and rural residences of the greater Winnemucca area. There it has an intersection with Westmoreland Road (which heads due west to the airport). Near this intersection SR 294 turns easterly to run northeast and parallel to the Union Pacific Railroad tracks.

Development gradually increases near the highway as it parallels the railroad as they head northeast into the Winnemucca city limits. At an intersection with Hanson Street (the eastern terminus of Nevada State Route 787 [SR 787]), the route reaches its current northern terminus. (Hanson Street [SR 787] heads northwest to connect with U.S. Route 95/Interstate 80 Business [I‑80 Bus.] at the western terminus of SR 787. Hanson Street also continues easterly as city street through the southern part of the town to end at an intersection with South Highland Drive and Water Canyon Road.) Beyond the northern terminus, West Haskell Street continues northeast (along what was formerly also part of SR 294) to end at intersection with East Winnemucca Boulevard (State Route 794/I‑80 Bus.).

History
SR 294 became a state highway on March 26, 1981. The route originally continued north past its current northern terminus (and the eastern terminus of SR 787 [Hanson Street]) along West Haskell Road to end at East Winnemucca Boulevard (SR 794/I‑80 Bus.). This portion of the route was turned over to local control by 2017.

Major intersections

See also

 List of state routes in Nevada
 List of highways numbered 294

References

External links

294
Transportation in Humboldt County, Nevada